Larbi Bouhali (born 1912, in El Kantara) was an Algerian communist politician. Bouhali served as general secretary of the Algerian Communist Party.

Born in El Kantara, Bouhali hailed from an Arab peasant family. In 1934 he travelled to Moscow, where he received political training for 9 months. Bouhali took part in the founding congress of the Algerian Communist Party in 1936. In 1939 he was named secretary of the Algerian People's Aid (Secours populaire algerien), an organization dedicated to assisting victims of colonial repression.

In 1940 Bouhali, along with other Communist Party leaders, was imprisoned and deported to the Sahara. He was detained at the Djenien-Bou-Rezg concentration camp. At the third party congress, held in 1947, Bouhali was elected general secretary of the party, substituting Amar Ouzegane.

Bouhali was exiled throughout the Algerian War of Independence. When the insurrection broke out, he moved to metropolitan France, and after the banning of the Algerian Communist Party on 13 September 1955 he moved to East Germany. At the time of Algerian independence in 1962 he remained in East Germany. Bouhali returned to Algeria, but went into exile again (along with other communist leaders) a few months after the 1965 coup d'état.

He later became a member of the central leadership of the Socialist Vanguard Party (PAGS).

Bouhali represented the Algerian communists at different international events, such as the 10th anniversary of the People's Republic of China in Peking 1959 and the 1969 International Meeting of Communist and Workers Parties in Moscow.

References

1912 births
Algerian Communist Party politicians
Year of death missing
People from Biskra Province
Algerian exiles